England competed at the 1954 British Empire and Commonwealth Games in Vancouver, British Columbia, Canada, from 30 July to 7 August 1954.

England finished at the top of the medal table.

Medal table

The athletes that competed are listed below.

Athletes

Bowls

Boxing

Cycling

Diving

Fencing

Rowing

Swimming

Weightlifting

Wrestling

References

1954
Nations at the 1954 British Empire and Commonwealth Games
British Empire & Commonwealth Games